Arouca may refer to:


Places

Portugal
 Arouca, Portugal, a municipality and a town in the Metropolitan Area of Porto, Portugal 
 Arouca Abbey, former Cistercian monastery from the 10th century
 Arouca 516, a suspension bridge located in the municipality of Arouca

Trinidad and Tobago
 Arouca, Trinidad and Tobago, a town in Regional Corporation of Tunapuna-Piarco 
 Arouca River, a tributary of the Caroni River

Other uses
 Arouca (footballer) (born 1986), Brazilian footballer
 F.C. Arouca, a Portuguese football club